NSFW is Internet slang or shorthand for subject matter that is not suitable/safe for work.

NSFW may also refer to:

 NSFW (album), 2011 album by comedy band Ninja Sex Party
 NSFW magazine, a photography magazine
 "NSFW Show", a podcast series produced by TWiT.tv
 "NSFW", a song from the album IV: Revenge of the Vengeance by comedy band Psychostick